Little Cherrystone, also known as Moses House and Wooding House, is a historic home located near Chatham, Pittsylvania County, Virginia. The main house was built in several sections and consists of two major building units plus at least two minor sections.  The oldest section is a one-story frame structure in two sections.  It is connected by a two-story frame hyphen to a two-story, Federal style brick structure built about 1800.  It has a gable roof and exterior end chimney.

It was listed on the National Register of Historic Places in 1969.

References

Houses on the National Register of Historic Places in Virginia
Federal architecture in Virginia
Houses completed in 1800
Houses in Pittsylvania County, Virginia
National Register of Historic Places in Pittsylvania County, Virginia